An eggcorn is the alteration of a phrase through the mishearing or reinterpretation of one or more of its elements, creating a new phrase having a different meaning from the original but which still makes sense and is plausible when used in the same context. Eggcorns often arise as people attempt to make sense of a stock phrase that uses a term unfamiliar to them, as for example replacing "Alzheimer's disease" with "old-timers' disease", or Shakespeare's "to the manner born" with "to the manor born".

Language change 
Eggcorns arise when people attempt to use analogy and logic to make sense of an expression – often a stock one – that includes a term which is not meaningful to them. For example, the stock expression "in one fell swoop" might be replaced by "in one foul swoop", the infrequently-used adjective "fell" (for "fierce", "cruel", or "terrible") being replaced with the more common word "foul" in order to convey the cruel/underhand meaning of the phrase as the speaker understands it.

Eggcorns are of interest to linguists as they not only show language changing in real time, but can also shed light on how and why the change occurs.

Etymology
The term egg corn (later contracted into one word, eggcorn) was coined by professor of linguistics Geoffrey Pullum in September 2003 in response to an article by Mark Liberman on the website Language Log, a group blog for linguists. In his article, Liberman discussed the case of a woman who had used the phrase egg corn for acorn, and he noted that this specific type of substitution lacked a name. Pullum suggested using egg corn itself as a label.

Examples 

 "damp squid" for "damp squib"
 "ex-patriot" for "expatriate"
 "the feeble position" for "the fetal position"
 "for all intensive purposes" for "for all intents and purposes"
 "free reign" for "free rein"
"in one foul swoop" for "in one fell swoop"
 "jar-dropping" for "jaw-dropping"
 "old-timers' disease" for "Alzheimer's disease"
 "on the spurt of the moment" for "on the spur of the moment"
 "preying mantis" for "praying mantis"
 "real trooper" for "real trouper"
 "to the manor born" for "to the manner born"
 "with baited breath" for "with bated breath"

Similar phenomena

Eggcorn is similar to, but differs from, folk etymology, malapropism, mondegreen and pun.

 Unlike a folk etymology (a change in the form of a word caused by widespread misunderstanding of the word's etymology), an eggcorn may be limited to one person rather than being used generally within a speech community
 A malapropism generally derives its effect from a comic misunderstanding of the user, often creating a nonsensical phrase: an eggcorn on the other hand is a substitution that exhibits creativity or logic 
 A mondegreen is a misinterpretation of a word or phrase, often within the lyrics of a specific song or other type of performance, and need not make sense within that context. An eggcorn must still retain something of the original meaning, as the speaker understands it, and may be a replacement for a poorly-understood phrase rather than a mishearing
 In a pun, the speaker or writer intentionally creates a humorous effect, whereas an eggcorn may be used or created by someone who is unaware that the expression is non-standard.

Where the spoken form of an eggcorn sounds the same as the original, it becomes a type of homophone.

References

Further reading 
 
 
 Harbeck, James. (2010-06-02) "My Veil of Tears" Retrieved 2012-01-26.
 Liberman, Mark, and Geoffrey K. Pullum. (2006) Far from the Madding Gerund and Other Dispatches from Language Log. Wilsonville, OR: William, James & Co.
 Liberman, Mark. (2003-09-23) "Egg corns: folk etymology, malapropism, mondegreen, ???" Language Log (weblog) Retrieved 2009-06-23.
 Peters, Mark. (2006-08-09) "Like a Bowl in a China Shop." The Chronicle of Higher Education: Chronicle Careers. Retrieved 2009-06-23.

External links 

Eggcorn database

Lexicology
Etymology
2000s neologisms